Bleiker High School (Bleiker videregående skole) is
located in Asker, Norway. The school was established in 1969 under the name Asker vocational school and was the first vocational school in Asker . Previously, students would take vocational education go to Sandvika. But in 1967, two branch classes in Asker, and they became the basis for the new school was the first time lived in many places. After 10 years it got its own school building in 1979.

1979
The school had five specializations in 1979:
 Craftse and Industrial ( HI )
 Home Economics ( HH )
 Arts & Crafts ( HE)
 Social and Health (SH)
 Trade and Commercial Subjects

2010
In 2010 the school had these specializations;
 Alternative Education
 Electrical
 Restaurant and Food Processing
 Service and Transport
 Studiespesialisering Design Studies
 Technical and Industrial Production
 Specialization in general studies, economic and administrative sciences
 Media and Communication
 Music, dance and drama
 Alternative education

In autumn 2010 the Health and Social Care specializations returned to Bleiker.

References 

Schools in Norway
Vocational education in Norway
Asker
Education in Viken (county)
Educational institutions established in 1969
1969 establishments in Norway